Softengi is a Ukrainian IT outsourcing service provider. It was established in 2009 as a spin-off of the Softline software development company. Softline was established by graduates of the Kyiv Polytechnic Institute in 1995.

Softengi's main competencies are outsourcing software development, outsourcing of IT business processes, mobile application development, 3D modeling, and consulting. The company's software engineers are certified by Microsoft and Oracle. The company's project managers are B and C level certified by The International Project Management Association.

Softengi has offices in Kyiv, Kharkiv, and Zhytomyr, and representative offices in Tbilisi, Georgia and California.

Softengi belongs to the Intecracy Group, an international IT-consortium with more than 600 IT specialists and is a member of Hi-Tech Initiative, the European Business Association, USUBC, and IT Ukraine associations.

The company is a Microsoft Gold partner.

History 
 1995, Softline founded
 1997, first major project for a United States customer
 1999, established a distributed team of developers to implement Java projects for US customers
 2001, created software development center based on .Net technology for a US customer
 2002, 3-year project on legacy systems geoengineering and its transfer to a new technology platform for European customers
 2003, certificate of compliance with ISO 9001:2000 international quality standard
 2004, active work in the US market started with the cooperation of Volia Software
 2005, certification for compliance with Capability Maturity Model CMM level 3
 2006, 3D modeling studio.
 2007, international projects organized by the European Commission and the United Nations. The company was certified for compliance with the CMMI Level 4
 2008, projects for the Ukrainian government and in Georgia, Kazakhstan and Russia
 2009, Softengi spun off. Softengi joined the Intecracy Group IT consortium.
 2010, Softengi established new software development department for iPhone and iPad
 2011, Softengi received ISO 9001:2008 certificate.

Projects

Software development 
Softengi develops projects using .Net, Java, the web, 3D and mobile technologies (Android, iOS). The company developed a management system for insurance companies in Switzerland, covering insurance company internal processes, performing calculations and generating documents.

The company improved the functionality of the internal credits system for the Bank of Georgia transferring it to Microsoft's SharePoint 2010 platform. The major feature of the project was the absence of the Georgian language pack for SharePoint. Softengi localized the system with a Georgian user interface.

Development centers 
Softengi's biggest development center is for Enviance, Inc., based in California, USA. Softengi developed software applications based on a SaaS model. In addition to this project, traditional client‐server applications were reengineered and deployed to the SaaS environment. More than a million engineer-hours were dedicated to the project. More than 40 employees worked on the project.

Mobile applications 
The Accelerometer application for iPhone counts steps with distance, speed and calculates the number of calories burned.

The iCSound application for iPad gives the user an opportunity to create music, "seeing" the sound from various musical instruments and pre-composed loops mixed together. iCSound allows to mix up to 40 music loops with unlimited audio effects.

The Country/City guide application for Android mobile devices employs GPS and Google Maps indicating nearby points of interest (POI). The integration with Layare (augmented reality) displayed points of interest, bus stations, restaurants, etc., and let users add their own POIs.

3D and stereo interactive complex 
The company's 3D studio was created in 2004. By 2012 it had fulfilled 60 projects. The company developed interactive 3D models of the Bombardier CH850 interior in partnership with Eon Reality for Bombardier. The project was implemented using EON Studio in combination with EON I-Catcher technology used for modeling. The project was used by Bombardier at the EBACE convention in Geneva, May 2006.

Interactive architectural visualization 
Softengi's 3D studio developed Unity-based solutions for architectural visualization, allowing construction companies and architectural firms to reduce by 40% the cost of 3D presentation development.

Augmented reality 
Softengi implemented augmented reality projects with Kinect. An augmented reality module using Kinect allowed a user to interact without contact with the image through body postures, capturing movement at special points on the body, and thus carrying out a complete 3-dimensional recognition of body movements.

References

Outsourcing companies
Software companies of Ukraine